At the 1936 Summer Olympics in Berlin, eleven swimming events were contested, six for men and five for women. The competitions were held from Saturday August 8, 1936 to Saturday August 15, 1936.  There was a total of 248 participants from 29 countries competing.

Medal table

Medal summary

Men's events

Women's events

Participating nations
248 swimmers from 29 nations competed.

References

External links
 

 
1936 Summer Olympics events
1936
1936 in swimming